The 1960 Meath Intermediate Football Championship is the 34th edition of the Meath GAA's premier club Gaelic football tournament for intermediate graded teams in County Meath, Ireland. The tournament consists of 12 teams. The championship format consists of a league stage.

No team was regraded from the 1959 S.F.C.

At the end of the season Carlanstown, Castletown and Millbrook applied to be regraded to the 1961 J.A.F.C. while Fordstown and Kilberry applied to be regraded to the 1961 J.B.F.C.

On 16 October 1960, Athboy claimed their 1st Intermediate championship title when they defeated St. Patrick's 2-7 to 1-3 in the final at Pairc Tailteann.

Team changes
 

The following teams have changed division since the 1959 championship season.

From I.F.C.
Promoted to 1960 S.F.C.
 Donaghmore -  (Intermediate Champions)

Relegated to 1960 J.A.F.C.
 Clonard
 Curraha
 Duleek

Disbanded:
 Oldcastle - (Didn't enter another team into Meath GAA competitions until the 1964 J.A.F.C.)

To I.F.C.
Regraded from 1959 S.F.C.
 None

Promoted from 1959 J.A.F.C. & J.B.F.C.
 Drumree - (Junior & Junior 'A' Divisional Champions)
 St. Patrick's - (Junior 'A' Divisional Runners-Up)
 Millbrook - (Junior 'A' Semi-Finalists)
 Kilberry - (Junior 'A' Semi-Finalists)

Group stage
There are 2 groups called Group A and B. The top finisher in each group will qualify for the Final. Some results were unavailable in the Meath Chronicle.

Group A

Round 1:
 Slane 3-4, 0-4 Kilberry, Pairc Tailteann, 6/3/1960,
 Castletown 2-3, 0-3 Kilmainhamwood, Kells, 13/3/1960,
 St. Patrick's w, l Dunshaughlin, Ashbourne, 13/3/1960,

Round 2:
 Kilmainhamwood 3-9, 3-5 Kilberry, Kells, 22/5/1960,
 Dunshaughlin 3-11, 2-5 Castletown, Skryne, 29/5/1960,
 St. Patrick's 3-8, 0-6 Slane, Pairc Tailteann, 18/9/1960,

Round 3:
 St. Patrick's -vs- Castletown, Lougher, 5/6/1960,
 Kilmainhamwood -vs- Slane, Castletown, 26/6/1960,
 Dunshaughlin w, l Kilberry, Kilmessan, 24/7/1960,

Round 4:
 St. Patrick's -vs- Kilmainhamwood, Pairc Tailteann, 17/7/1960,
 Kilberry 1-6, 2-1 Castletown, Kells, 31/7/1960,
 Slane 1-8, 0-7 Dunshaughlin, Skryne, 21/8/1960,

Round 5:
 St. Patrick's w, l Kilberry, Skryne, 21/8/1960,
 Kilmainhamwood -vs- Dunshaughlin, 
 Slane -vs- Castletown,

Group B

Round 1:
 Athboy 3-6, 1-3 Fordstown, Pairc Tailteann, 6/3/1960, 
 Millbrook 1-6, 0-4 Carlanstown, Kells, 13/3/1960,
 Drumree w, l Ballinabrackey, Trim, 13/3/1960,

Round 2:
 Millbrook 0-9, 0-5 Fordstown, Kells, 3/4/1960,
 Drumree w, l Carlanstown, Dunderry, 26/6/1960,
 Ballinabrackey 1-5, 1-5 Athboy, Kildalkey, 3/7/1960,

Round 3:
 Fordstown 2-1, 0-4 Carlanstown, Kells, 17/7/1960,
 Athboy 1-5, 0-7 Drumree, Kilmessan, 24/7/1960,
 Ballinabrackey w, l Millbrook, Kildalkey, 24/7/1960,

Round 4:
 Drumree 1-10, 2-5 Millbrook, Pairc Tailteann, 28/8/1960,
 Ballinabrackey w, l Fordstown, 
 Athboy w/o, scr Carlanstown, 

Round 5:
 Athboy 1-8, 1-4 Millbrook, Kells, 18/9/1960,
 Ballinabrackey w/o, scr Carlanstown, 
 Drumree w/o, scr Fordstown,

Final
 Athboy 2-7, 1-3 St. Patrick's, Pairc Tailteann, 16/10/1960.

References

External links

Meath Intermediate Football Championship
Meath Intermediate Football Championship